Belgrandiella is a genus of minute freshwater snails with a gill and an operculum, aquatic gastropod mollusks in the family Hydrobiidae.

Species 
The genus Belgrandiella includes the following species:
Belgrandiella austriana (Radoman, 1975)
Belgrandiella bachkovoensis(Glöer & Georgiev, 2009)
Belgrandiella fuchsi Boeters, 1970
Belgrandiella ganslmayri Haase, 1993
Belgrandiella intermedia (Boeters, 1970)
Belgrandiella kusceri (Wagner, 1914) - type species
Belgrandiella mimula (Boeters, 1970)
Belgrandiella parreyssi (Pfeiffer, 1841)
Belgrandiella pelerei Haase, 1994
Belgrandiella petrovi 
Belgrandiella styriaca Stojaspal, 1978
Belgrandiella wawrai Haase, 1996
 Belgrandiella bojniciensis 

Synonyms: The following names are junior synonyms for Alzoniella slovenica: Belgrandiella alticola, Belgrandiella bojnicensis, Belgrandiella komenskyi, Belgrandiella slovenica.

References 

 
Hydrobiidae
Taxonomy articles created by Polbot